Bedford is an unincorporated community in eastern Livingston County, in the U.S. state of Missouri.

The community is on Missouri Route J four miles northeast of Avalon. The Grand River flows past the north side of the community and the Fountain Grove Conservation Area is two miles east.

History
Bedford was laid out in 1839. A post office called Bedford was established in 1858, and remained in operation until 1931.

References

Unincorporated communities in Livingston County, Missouri
Unincorporated communities in Missouri